Vrysoules may refer to several places in Cyprus and Greece:

In Cyprus

Vrysoules, Cyprus, located near Famagusta, next to the occupied territory from Turkish Forces since 1974

In Greece

Vrysoules, Arcadia, a village in Arcadia
Vrysoules, Arta, a village in the municipal unit Vlacherna, Arta regional unit